Laurie Jill Michelson (born June 18, 1967) is a United States district judge of the United States District Court for the Eastern District of Michigan and former United States magistrate judge of the same court.

Biography
Michelson received an Artium Baccalaureus degree in 1989 from the University of Michigan. She received a Juris Doctor in 1992 from Northwestern University School of Law. From 1992 to 1993, she served as a law clerk to Judge Cornelia G. Kennedy of the United States Court of Appeals for the Sixth Circuit. She joined the law firm of Butzel Long as an associate in 1993, becoming a shareholder in 2000. Her private practice specialized in media law, intellectual property and white collar criminal defense. In 2011, she was appointed as a United States magistrate judge of the United States District Court for the Eastern District of Michigan, a capacity in which she served until her elevation as a district court judge on March 14, 2014.

Federal judicial service

On July 25, 2013, President Barack Obama nominated Michelson to serve as a United States District Judge of the United States District Court for the Eastern District of Michigan, to the seat vacated by Judge George Caram Steeh III, who assumed senior status on January 29, 2013. On January 16, 2014, her nomination was reported out of committee. A cloture vote was held on Tuesday, March 11, 2014, 
cloture was invoked on her nomination by a 56–43 vote. On Wednesday, March 12, 2014, the United States Senate voted 98–0 for final confirmation. She received her judicial commission on March 14, 2014.

References

External links

1967 births
Living people
Judges of the United States District Court for the Eastern District of Michigan
Michigan lawyers
Northwestern University Pritzker School of Law alumni
United States district court judges appointed by Barack Obama
21st-century American judges
United States magistrate judges
University of Michigan alumni
21st-century American women judges